Hamburg Transit is a German crime television series, first aired in 1970. It ran for 52 episodes over four series until 1974. It depicts the officers of the Hamburg CID. It was a successor to Polizeifunk ruft which ran between 1966 and 1970.

It was shot at the Wandsbek Studios and on location around Hamburg.

Main cast
 Karl-Heinz Hess as  Kriminalhauptwachtmeister Walter Hartmann
 Eckart Dux as  Kriminalobermeister Schlüter
 Heinz-Gerhard Lueck as Commissioner Castorp
 Gert Haucke as Commissioner John

References

External links

German crime television series
1970s German police procedural television series
1970 German television series debuts
Television shows set in Hamburg
1974 German television series endings
German-language television shows
Sequel television series
Das Erste original programming